The Rue-du-Bois Military Cemetery is a World War I cemetery located in the commune of Fleurbaix, in the Pas-de-Calais departement of France, about  southwest of the village of Fleurbaix on the D171 road (rue Louis Bouquet), just before the hamlet of Pétillon.

Of the 845 graves, 395 are of unknown soldiers.

See also
 Le Trou Aid Post Cemetery
 V.C. Corner Australian Cemetery and Memorial
 Fromelles (Pheasant Wood) Military Cemetery

References

External links
 Site with photos
 

British military memorials and cemeteries
Australian military cemeteries
World War I cemeteries in France
Cemeteries in Pas-de-Calais
Commonwealth War Graves Commission cemeteries in France